Harry Ryan (7 April 1957 – 24 November 2020) was an Irish hurler who played for the Kilkenny Senior Hurling team in the All Ireland Hurling Championship and his parish club Clara and at inter-county level. Ryan also played with Mount Leinster Rangers and was involved in coaching after his retirement from the game. He usually lined out as a left corner-forward. Ryan also achieved winning all Irelands at minor, U21 and Senior completing the holy grail of an intercounty hurlers career .

Honours

 St. Kieran's College
 All-Ireland Colleges Senior Hurling Championship (1): 1975
 Leinster Colleges Senior Hurling Championship (1): 1975

Clara
 Kilkenny Senior Hurling Championship (1): 1986

 Kilkenny
 All-Ireland Senior Hurling Championship (1): 1983
 Leinster Senior Hurling Championship (3): 1983, 1986, 1987
 National Hurling League (2): 1982-83, 1985-86
 All-Ireland Under-21 Hurling Championship (1): 1977
 Leinster Under-21 Hurling Championship (2): 1976, 1977
 All-Ireland Minor Hurling Championship (1): 1975 (c)
 Leinster Minor Hurling Championship (1): 1975 (c)

References

1957 births
2020 deaths
Clara hurlers
Kilkenny inter-county hurlers
All-Ireland Senior Hurling Championship winners